Chicago Patriots Gaelic Football Club is a Gaelic Athletic Association in Chicago, US.
The Patriots were formed by longtime Chicago GAA supporter Joseph Begley in the spring of 2005. This new team was formed to compete as an all-American-born team in the North American finals in the Junior C competition.

External links
Chicago Patriots on Facebook

Patriots Gaelic
Gaelic football clubs in the United States
Gaelic Athletic Association clubs established in 2005
2005 establishments in Illinois